Jessica Jung is a  Korean-American singer, songwriter, actress, and businesswoman. Her discography consists of three extended plays and five singles. Her debut extended play, With Love, J peaked atop the Gaon Album Chart and spawned the top-ten single "Fly" featuring Fabolous. The follow-up EP Wonderland also charted atop the chart. To celebrate her 10th anniversary as a singer, she released her third EP My Decade

Extended plays

Singles

As lead artist

As featured artist

Promotional singles

Soundtrack appearances

Other charted songs

Other appearances

Music videos

Notes

References

Jessica Jung
K-pop discographies